Hold On to Love may refer to:

"Hold On to Love" (Peter Skellern song)
"Hold On to Love" (Aiko Kayō song)
"I Want You (Hold On to Love)", a song by Cee Lo Green

 "Hold On to Love", a song by Gary Moore from the album Victims of the Future
 "Hold On to Love", a song by Jon Anderson from the album In the City of Angels
 "Hold On to Love", a song by Rabbitt from the album Revival
 "Hold On to Love", a song by T'Pau from the album The Promise

See also
Hold On to Your Love (disambiguation)